Long-Distance Princess (stylized as long-distance princess) is a 2014 teen romantic-comedy film written and directed by Lionel Chew, Ph.D.  It stars Alicen Evans, Parker Harris, Justin Price, David Oakes, Bennet Jaffarian, Laura Green, KJ Kim, Kara Hyatt, Tracy Cheney and Andrea Headley.  Long-Distance Princess is approved by the Dove Foundation and distributed by Bridgestone Media Group, which released it on DVD, October 28, 2014.

Plot 
Lisa, a high school sophomore, has a serious crush on Todd, a popular athlete in her art class.  After he sees a picture of her stunning friend, Ellie, who is in England, he asks Lisa to help him get to know her.  While Lisa helps Ellie get to know Todd, she becomes closer to him, too.  Lisa can’t help but wonder if he enjoys his time together with her as well or he’s just hung up on Ellie.

Unfortunately, Todd’s cheerleader, ex-girlfriend, Cindy, really wants him back.  She finds out that Lisa is helping Ellie get close to him and becomes furious.   She along with her cheerleading friends turn to vicious tactics to stop Lisa and Ellie.  What makes things even tougher on Lisa, Todd’s best buddies, Curt and Booce, are obsessed with their image as ballers and try to keep him from being around Lisa because they think her looks are too ordinary.

Through all the struggles, one thing Lisa appreciates is her Christian friend, Theo.  Though she isn't a Christian herself, she really respects his faith and encouragement.  Theo tries to help Lisa see and solve her situations with biblical perspectives.  However, her best friend, Mitzy, isn't so inclined and encourages Lisa to do whatever it takes to try and get Todd.

Cast 
 Alicen Evans as Lisa
 Parker Harris as Todd
 Bennet Jaffarian as Mitzy
 Justin Price as Curt
 K.J. Kim as Theo
 Laura M. Green as Cindy
 David Oakes as Booce
 Andrea Headley as Mysterious Woman
 Kara Michelle Hyatt as Stephanie
 Tracy Cheney as Ms. Mitchell
 Isabella Lent as Julie
 Kylie Wood as Apologetic Girl
 Bryan Suchey as Mischievous Boy
 Kirsten Cheong as Wendy
 Breanna Valenzona as Inquiring Student
 Alison Axelrad as "Ellie"

Production 
Long-Distance Princess was filmed with a Sony CineAlta HD camera.

It was shot in various locations across Southern California, such as Hesperia, Victorville, Thousand Oaks, Tarzana, Norco, Covina, San Dimas and Malibu.

In an interview with the Movie Mom, Director Lionel Chew revealed why he wanted to make Long-Distance Princess:I wanted to reach teens with something positive and affirming, knowing that most Hollywood fare hasn’t been meeting this need.  Teens today are assailed by so many confusing messages and aren’t sure where to turn…It’s not surprising that tragically the teen suicide rate in our nation has been rising, especially among girls . To combat all this, I purposed to make a movie that showed that someone (up above) cares about them and their struggles and that ethics and convictions are still powerfully relevant. I also wanted to let them know there’s real hope.

Release 
The movie was released on DVD on October 28, 2014.

References

External links 
 
 

Films about Christianity